Anton Alén (born 3 June 1983) is a Finnish rally driver, who competed in World Rally Championship and Intercontinental Rally Challenge during his career. He was a factory driver for Fiat Abarth from 2007 to 2009. He scored one IRC victory, at 2007 Rally Russia. Hís father Markku Alén became one-time World Rally Champion in 1978 with the legendary Fiat 131 Abarth.

IRC results

References

External links 

 Personal website;
 Anton Alén at www.rallybase.nl;
 Anton Alén at www.ewrc-results.com;
 Anton Alén at www.rallye-info.com

1983 births
Living people
Finnish rally drivers
Intercontinental Rally Challenge drivers
World Rally Championship drivers
Place of birth missing (living people)